Commerce is the large-scale organized system of activities, functions, procedures and institutions which directly and indirectly contributes to the transfer of goods and services on a large scale and at the right time, place, quantity and price from the original producers to the final consumers within local, regional, national or international economies  More specifically, commerce is not business (i.e. an organization or activity whose goal is to sell manufactured goods and/or services for profit), but rather the part of business which is related to the movement and distribution of finished or intermediate (but valuable) goods and services from the primary manufacturers to the end customers on a large scale, as opposed to the sourcing of raw materials and manufacturing of those goods. 

Commerce is different from trade as well. Trade is the transaction (buying and selling) of goods and services which makes a profit for the seller and satisfies the want or need of the buyer. When trade is carried out within a country, it is called home or domestic trade, which can be wholesale or retail. A wholesaler buys from the producer in bulk and sells to the retailer who then sells again to the final consumer in smaller quantities. Trade between a country and the rest of the world is called foreign or international trade, which consists of import trade and export trade, both being wholesale in general. Commerce not only includes trade as defined above, but also the auxiliary services and means which facilitate such trade. These auxiliary services include transportation, communication, warehousing, insurance, banking, financial markets, advertising, packaging, the services of commercial agents and agencies, etc. In other words, commerce encompasses a wide array of political, economical, technological, logistical, legal, regulatory, social and cultural aspects of trade on a large scale. From a marketing perspective, commerce creates time and place utility by making goods and services available to the customers at the right place and at the right time by changing their location or placement. Described in this manner, trade is a part of commerce and commerce is a part of business.

Commerce was a costly endeavor in the antiquities because of the risky nature of transportation, which restricted it to local markets. Commerce then expanded along with the improvement of transportation systems over time. In the middle ages, long-distance and large-scale commerce was still limited within continents. With the advent of the age of exploration and oceangoing ships, commerce took an international, trans-continental stature. Currently the reliability of international trans-oceanic shipping and mailing systems and the facility of the Internet has made commerce possible between cities, regions and countries situated anywhere in the world. In the 21st century, Internet-based electronic commerce (where financial information is transferred over Internet), and its subcategories such as wireless mobile commerce and social network-based social commerce have been and continue to get adopted widely. 

Legislative bodies and ministries or ministerial departments of commerce regulate, promote and manage domestic and foreign commercial activities within a country. International commerce can be regulated by bilateral treaties between countries. However, after the second world war and the rise of free trade among nations, multilateral arrangements such as the GATT and later the World Trade Organization became the principal systems regulating global commerce. The International Chamber of Commerce (ICC) is another important organization which sets rules and resolves disputes in international commerce.

Etymology
The English-language word commerce has been derived from the Latin word commercium, from com ("together") and merx ("merchandise").

History

Historian Peter Watson and Ramesh Manickam date the history of long-distance commerce from circa 150,000 years ago.

In historic times, the introduction of currency as a standardized money facilitated the exchange of goods and services.

Banking systems developed in medieval Europe, facilitating financial transactions across national boundaries. Markets became a feature of town life, and were regulated by town authorities.

See also

 Bachelor of Business Administration
 Bachelor of Commerce
 Master of Commerce
 Doctor of Commerce
 Business
 Capitalism
 Commercial law
 Advertising
 Distribution (business)
 Wholesale
 Retailing
 Cargo
 Eco commerce
 Economy
 Electronic commerce
 Export
 Fair
 Financial planning (business)
 Fishery
 Harvest
 Import
 Laissez-faire
 Manufacturing
 Market (economics)
 Marketing
 Marketplace
 Mass production
 Master of Commerce
 Merchandising
 Roman commerce
 Trade
 International trade
 Value (economics)

References

Trade